Henry Levin may refer to:

 Henry Levin (film director) (1909–1980), American stage actor and director
 Henry Levin (economist), professor of economics and education at Columbia University